Chris Clements may refer to:

 Chris Clements (animation director), animation director with The Simpsons
 Chris Clements (fighter) (born 1976), Canadian mixed martial artist
 Chris Clements (footballer) (born 1990), English footballer
 Chris Clements (soccer) (born 1987), American soccer player